His Jonah Day is a 1920 American silent comedy film featuring Oliver Hardy.

Cast
 Jimmy Aubrey as The tourist
 Oliver Hardy as The life saver (as Babe Hardy)
 Evelyn Nelson as The girl
 Rosa Gore as Her maiden aunt
 Estelle Harrison as The nursemaid
 Jack Lloyd as Fisherman
 George Fox as The grouch

See also
 List of American films of 1920
 Oliver Hardy filmography

External links

1920 films
1920 short films
American silent short films
American black-and-white films
1920 comedy films
Films directed by Jess Robbins
Silent American comedy films
American comedy short films
1920s American films